Interstate 90 (I-90) in the US state of Illinois runs roughly northwest-to-southeast through the northern part of the state. From the Wisconsin state line at South Beloit, it heads south to Rockford before heading east-southeast to the Indiana state line at Chicago. I-90 traverses  through a variety of settings, from farmland west of the Fox River Valley through the medium-density suburbs west of O'Hare International Airport, through Downtown Chicago, and through the heart of the industrial southeast side of Chicago before entering Indiana.

I-90 comprises several named highways. The Interstate runs along the Jane Addams Memorial Tollway (previously called the Northwest Tollway) from South Beloit to O'Hare Airport, the Kennedy Expressway from O'Hare to the Chicago Loop, the Dan Ryan Expressway from the Loop to the Chicago Skyway, and the Skyway to the Indiana state line. The Jane Addams and Chicago Skyway are toll roads maintained by the Illinois State Toll Highway Authority (ISTHA) and the Skyway Concession Company (SCC), respectively. The remainder of the highway is maintained by the Illinois Department of Transportation (IDOT).

Route description

I-90 enters Illinois from Beloit, Wisconsin concurrently with I-39.  At Exit 1 (South Beloit),  US Route 51 (US 51) joins the two interstates; between the exit and the state line marks the only point US 51 and I-39 are not concurrent in Illinois.   

In Rockton, I-39/I-90/US 51 becomes the Jane Addams Memorial Tollway, with the South Beloit Toll Plaza south of the interchange.  The three highways first enter the Rockford region at Illinois Route 173, passing by Rock Cut State Park; its first interchange with US 20 is with the business route (State Street) connecting Rockford and Belvidere.  

At Cherry Valley, I-90 splits with I-39/US-51 (the latter becomes concurrent for US 20 for five more miles before moving south to Normal.), with I-90 making a 90-degree turn east.  Crossing eastward, I-90 (now signed as a single highway) crosses the Kishwaukee River before entering Boone County.  From this point to the eastern terminus of both highways in Massachusetts, I-90 and US 20 run a roughly parallel routing (though with no concurrency).  

After passing in front of the Stellantis Belvidere Assembly Plant and a westbound toll plaza, the only remaining Illinois Tollway oasis above I-90 is located in Belvidere.  The over-highway design provides several vendors in a single location, allowing tollway travelers to rest, eat, and refuel without exiting the tollway.     

Turning southeast towards McHenry County, I-90 does not have an interchange for another , until Illinois Route 23 (IL 23) in Riley (five miles north of Marengo).   Following the interchange, eastbound traffic passes through the Marengo Toll Plaza.  

Entering Kane County, I-90 has a third interchange with US 20, connecting to Hampshire. As it passes its Randall Road exit, I-90 transitions from the rural farmland seen in Boone and McHenry counties to the western terminus of the Chicago suburbs.  Following the east/west Elgin Toll Plaza, I-90 widens from six to eight lanes, turning east in direction.  Before crossing into Cook County, I-90 crosses the Fox River, entering the Golden Corridor of Illinois.      

Before meeting I-290, the tollway passes through Hoffman Estates and Schaumburg, routed through a wide variety of surroundings, including housing, retail centers, and forest preserves.  Following the Barrington Road exit, active traffic management gantries are in place.  In Schaumburg, I-90 becomes the northern terminus of I-290 (the only Illinois loop of I-90).  Turning further southeast towards Elk Grove Village, I-90 is widened from eight to ten lanes.  At Elmhurst Road (Illinois 83), the tollway is narrowed to eight lanes, passing north of O'Hare International Airport.  Prior to passing through I-190/I-294 (Tri-State Tollway), Rosemont has a final toll plaza on Devon Avenue (westbound) and River Road (eastbound).

The Tri-State Tollway interchange marks the eastern terminus of the Jane Addams Memorial Tollway, with I-90 subsequently becoming a freeway called the Kennedy Expressway.  After crossing the Des Plaines River, the Kennedy Expressway enters Chicago.  After turning southeast, I-90 joins I-94 (Edens Expressway), heading further southeast.  Taking on the path of the Chicago River, the Kennedy Expressway becomes the Dan Ryan Expressway following its intersection of the Jane Byrne Interchange (passing the Eisenhower Expressway).  After crossing I-55 (Stevenson Expressway), I-90 continues nearly due south.   

In the Englewood neighborhood, I-90 splits from I-94, becoming the six-lane Chicago Skyway.   Turning southeast, the highway crosses the Calumet River before continuing into Hammond, Indiana.

History

Jane Addams Memorial Tollway
The  Northwest Tollway portion of I-90 opened on August 20, 1958. Prior to the opening, the first vehicle to officially travel the new roadway was a covered wagon navigated by local resident John Madsen who took five days to make the journey.

On September 7, 2007, highway officials responding to an effort by state lawmakers renamed the Northwest Tollway to Jane Addams Memorial Tollway, after Jane Addams, the Nobel Peace Prize winner and founder of the Settlement House movement in the US.

The Illinois Tollway's 2005–2012 Congestion-Relief Program provided $644.1 million (equivalent to $ in ) in improvements to the I-90 corridor. Projects included rebuilding and widening of the tollway between I-39 and Rockton Road, including a reconfiguration of the I-90/I-39 interchange to improve traffic flow. This construction started in 2008 and was completed by the end of 2009.

From 2013 to 2016, over $2 billion (equivalent to $ in ) was spent on rebuilding and widening the Jane Addams Memorial Tollway from I-39 to the Kennedy Expressway. The inside shoulders were widened for future transit opportunities, and active traffic management was incorporated into the corridor from IL 59 to the eastern end. In addition, almost all of the crossroad bridges were rebuilt and several interchanges were reconfigured/expanded. In 2019, a $33.4-million (equivalent to $ in ) interchange with IL 23 was added near Marengo to provide the first I-90 interchange in McHenry County.

Until 1978, I-90 was routed on the Congress Street Expressway (later named the Eisenhower Expressway) which was extended from the Loop to the interchange of the Northwest Tollway and IL 53. The Kennedy Expressway was signed only as I-94, and the portion of present-day I-90 between the Edens Expressway and IL 53 was not signed as an Interstate Highway. This provided a non-toll section of I-90 between Downtown Chicago and IL 53. The route designations were changed to their present form when I-90 was moved to follow the entire length of the Kennedy Expressway and the Jane Addams Tollway, and the original route was designated I-290.

Chicago Skyway

The Chicago Skyway was originally known as the Calumet Skyway. It cost $101 million (equivalent to $ in ) to construct and took about 34 months (nearly three years) to build. Nearly  of elevated roadway, the Chicago Skyway was originally built as a shortcut from State Street, a major north–south street on Chicago's South Side that serves the Loop, to the steel mills on the Southeast to the Indiana state line where the Indiana Toll Road begins. Later, when the Dan Ryan Expressway opened, the Chicago Skyway was extended west to connect to it. There are only two eastbound exits east of the toll barrier, whereas there are four westbound exits west of the toll barrier (so that no exits are available until one has crossed the bridge and paid the toll). The Chicago Skyway opened to traffic on April 16, 1958.

The Skyway's official name, referring to it as a "toll bridge" rather than a "toll road", is the result of a legal quirk. At the time of its construction, the city charter of Chicago did not provide the authority to construct a toll road. However, the city could build toll bridges, and it was found that there was no limit to the length of the approaches to the bridge. Therefore, the Skyway is technically a toll bridge spanning the Calumet River with a  approach. This also is part of the reason that there are no exits available until after one has crossed the bridge and paid the toll.

Historically, the Chicago Skyway was signed as, and was widely considered to be part of, I-90 from the mid-1960s forward (after I-90 in this area had been swapped with I-94). However, around 1999, the City of Chicago realized they had never received official approval to designate the Skyway as I-90. The city subsequently replaced most of the "I-90" signage with "TO I-90/I-94" signage. However, IDOT has always reported and continues to report the Skyway as part of the Interstate Highway System, and the Federal Highway Administration (FHWA) also considers the Chicago Skyway an official part of I-90. As of 2022, the Skyway is signed as part of I-90.

In the 1960s, the newly constructed Dan Ryan Expressway and the neighboring Calumet, Kingery, and Borman expressways provided free alternatives to the tollway, and the Skyway became much less used. As a result, from the 1970s through the early 1990s, the Skyway was unable to repay revenue bonds used in its construction. Traffic volumes rebounded from the late 1990s onward, partially because of the construction of casinos in Northwest Indiana, along with reconstruction of the Dan Ryan, Kingery, and Borman expressways. In June 2005, the Skyway became compatible with electronic toll collection, with users now able to pay tolls using I-Pass or E-ZPass transponders.

Chicago's Department of Streets and Sanitation formerly maintained the Chicago Skyway Toll Bridge System. A 2004 transaction that gave the city a $1.83-billion (equivalent to $ in ) cash infusion leased the Skyway to the Skyway Concession Company, a joint-venture between the Australian Macquarie Infrastructure Group and Spanish Cintra, which assumed operations on the Skyway on a 99-year operating lease. The agreement between the Skyway Concession Company and the City of Chicago marked the first time an existing toll road was moved from public to private operation in the US.

Exit list

Related routes
I-90 has two related auxiliary Interstate Highways within Illinois. I-190 is a spur into O'Hare International Airport in Chicago that is also known as the Kennedy Expressway O'Hare Extension or the O'Hare Expressway. I-290 takes a southeasterly dogleg left route accessing the western suburbs and heading eastward into Downtown Chicago. It is also known as the Dwight D. Eisenhower Expressway. A third route, the Western O'Hare Beltway, is under construction and has been designated I-490. This new route, passing along the west side of O'Hare between I-90 and I-294, is expected to open in 2023.

See also

List of bridges documented by the Historic American Engineering Record in Illinois

References

External links

Illinois Tollway official site
Official website of the Chicago Skyway
Chicago Department of Transportation
Description and history at Richard Carlson's Illinois Highways
Historic, Current & Average Travel Times For The Jane Addams Tollway
Best of Transportation Page
Chicago Skyway (I-90) at Steve Anderson's ChicagoRoads.com

Illinois
Expressways in the Chicago area
90
Transportation in Winnebago County, Illinois
Transportation in Boone County, Illinois
Transportation in McHenry County, Illinois
Transportation in Kane County, Illinois
Transportation in Cook County, Illinois